There are 67 counties in the U.S. state of Florida, which became a territory of the U.S. in 1821 with two counties complementing the provincial divisions retained as a Spanish territory, Escambia to the west and St. Johns to the east. Both counties are divided by the Suwannee River. All of the other counties were apportioned from these two original counties. Florida became the 27th U.S. state in 1845, and its last county was created in 1925 with the formation of Gilchrist County from a segment of Alachua County. Florida's counties are subdivisions of the state government. Florida's most populous county is Miami-Dade County, the seventh most populous county in the nation, with a population of 2,701,767 as of the 2020 census.

In 1968, counties gained the power to develop their own charters. All but two of Florida's county seats are incorporated municipalities: the exceptions are Crawfordville, county seat of rural Wakulla County, and East Naples, located outside Naples city limits in Collier County.

The names of Florida's counties reflect its diverse cultural heritage. Some are named for Confederate political leaders and Spanish explorers, marking the influence of Spanish sovereignty, while others are named for Christian saints, Native American sites, as well as political leaders of the United States. Natural features of the region, including rivers, lakes and flora, are also commonly used for county names. Florida has counties named for participants on both sides of Second Seminole War: Miami-Dade County is partially named for Francis L. Dade, a major in the U.S. Army at the time; Osceola County is named for the war's native Muscogee-Seminole resistance leader Osceola.

Population figures are based on the 2021 vintage Census population estimates. The population of Florida is 21,781,128, an increase of 1.1% from 2020. The average population of Florida's counties is 325,091; Miami-Dade County is the most populous (2,662,777) and Liberty County is the least (7,900). The average land area is 805 sq mi (2,085 km2). The largest county is Palm Beach County (2,034 sq mi, 5,268 km2) and the smallest is Union County (240 sq mi, 622 km2). The total area of the state is 65,795 sq miles, of which the land area constitutes  while the water area constitutes 11,868 sq miles.

The Federal Information Processing Standard (FIPS) is used by the U.S. government to uniquely identify counties, and is provided for each entry. These codes link to the United States Census Bureau's "quick facts" for each county. Florida's FIPS code of 12 is used to distinguish from counties in other states. For example, Alachua County's unique nationwide identifier is 12001.


Counties

|}

Former counties
Fayette County was created in 1832 from the portion of Jackson County east of the Chipola River, with county seat at Ochesee (now in Calhoun County east of Altha). In 1834 it was merged back into Jackson County.

Renamed counties
Five counties in Florida have been renamed. Most renamings occurred between 1845 and 1861, during the first sixteen years of Florida's statehood. One occurred in 1997, when Dade County changed its name to Miami-Dade County.

Proposed counties

See also
 Florida
 List of municipalities in Florida
 List of former municipalities in Florida
 List of places in Florida
 List of county seats in Florida
 List of census-designated places in Florida

Further reading

References
 Specific

 General

Atlas of Florida, revised edition. Edward A. Fernald & Elizabeth D. Purdum, editors (University Press of Florida, 1996). "Evolution of Counties", pp. 98–99.

Florida
 
Counties